Oxfendazole is a broad spectrum benzimidazole anthelmintic. Its main use is for protecting livestock against roundworm, strongyles and pinworms.  Oxfendazole is the sulfoxide metabolite of fenbendazole.

Oxfendazole is an anthelmintic (wormer) compound used in veterinary practice. It comes under the chemical class of the benzimidazoles. This drug is barely used in horses, goats, sheep, and cattle. It is very scarcely applied on dogs and cats. The drug for livestock is majorly available in the form of pills, tablets, drenches, bolus, etc. They are meant for oral consumption. Several drenches are allowed for intraruminal injection in some of the countries. Few countries also prefer injectables and pour-ons. For pet dogs, the drug is available in the form of drenches.

Efficacy

Both oxfendazole and fenbendazole are efficacious against gastrointestinal lungworms and roundworms of livestock, adults, and L4-larvae of the significant species for example, of the genera Bunostomum, Haemonchus, Ostertagia, Oesophagostomum, Nematodirus, Teladorsagia, Cooperia, Trichostrongylus, Dictyocaulus, Trichuris, etc., including against arrested larvae of some of the species. They are even highly efficient against majority of the livestock tapeworms. This drug works effectively against the main parasitic roundworms and tapeworms of dogs and cats.

The drug offers a small residual effect in ruminants unless and otherwise it is delivered by using a slow-release device. This essentially means that on a single administration it will help in killing the parasites which are present in the host during the time of treatment and also prevent against re-infestations for some more days but not weeks or months. The residual effect is comparatively shorter in non-ruminants. The drug is non-effective against flukes and external parasites at therapeutic dose.

References

Anthelmintics
Sulfoxides
Benzimidazoles
Carbamates